Stefan Blöcher (born 25 February 1960 in Wiesbaden, Hessen) is a former field hockey player from (West-)Germany, who competed at two Summer Olympics for his native country. On both occasions he won the silver medal with his team, in 1984 (Los Angeles and in 1988 (Seoul).

Blöcher played 259 international matches for (West)-Germany, and made his debut in 1978. He won the German title twice, became European champion five times, and won the silver medal at the Hockey World Cup in 1982. In 1987 he was voted the World Hockey Player of the Year. After his hockey career he became a fanatic golf player.

References
 sports-reference

External links
 

1960 births
Living people
German male field hockey players
Olympic field hockey players of West Germany
Olympic silver medalists for West Germany
Field hockey players at the 1984 Summer Olympics
Field hockey players at the 1988 Summer Olympics
Sportspeople from Wiesbaden
Olympic medalists in field hockey
Medalists at the 1984 Summer Olympics
Medalists at the 1988 Summer Olympics
1990 Men's Hockey World Cup players
20th-century German people